Neotachina   is a genus of tachinid flies in the family Tachinidae. The four known species in this genus were collected in New Zealand in 1938 and described by Scottish entomologist John Russell Malloch.

Diagnosis:

This genus keys out together with Chaetopletha, Phaoniella, Platytachina, Plethochaetigera, and Tachineo. It is considerably difficult to find satisfactory external characters to distinguish these genera in a dichotomous key. This difficulty is expressed by Malloch 1938 several times over as well as by Dugdale 1969. A thorough revision at the genus level is needed that includes molecular analysis, rearing and collecting of new material.

External links

Tachinidae
Diptera of New Zealand